Phil(l)(ip) Reid, Read or Reed may refer to:

Film and TV personalities
Phillip Reed (1908–1996), American actor; a/k/a Philip Reed and Phil Reed
Philip Reid, Australian film and TV editor since 1964; a/k/a Phil Reid (Last Dance (2012 film))
Phil Reid, Welsh actor in 2002 BBC Wales TV series First Degree#Cast

Politicians  
Philip Reed (politician) (1760–1829), American senator and congressman from Maryland
Phil Reed (1949–2008), American member of New York City Council

Sportspeople
Phil Read (1939–2022), English motorcycle racer
Phil Reid (born 1952), American high school golfing champion (Gary Koch#Early years)
Phil Reid, South Australian chairman of South Adelaide Panthers FC since 1997
Philip Reid (sportswriter) (born 1961), Irish journalist with The Irish Times
Phillip Read (born 1979), Australian rules footballer

Others
Philip Reid (c.1820–1892), African American craftsman in Washington, D.C.
Philip D. Reed (1899–1989), American CEO and president of General Electric
Phil Reid, British squadron leader in 2008 (RAF Bentley Priory#The final days of RAF occupation)
Philip Reed (game designer) (born 1972), American founder of Ronin Arts

See also
Philip Reade, pseudonym of unidentified American 1890s dime novel author (Thomas Edison in popular culture#Characters based on Edison)